Nanase Dam is a dam in the Ōita Prefecture, Japan, which was completed in 2020. It is mainly dedicated to flood control, with a retention capacity of 25.9 million cubic meters of water. It was previously known as Oitagawa Dam but was renamed on completion.

References 

Dams in Ōita Prefecture